Dodanduwa is a small coastal town situated in Galle District, Southern Province of Sri Lanka.

Prior to the Second World War, Dodanduwa was known as the commercial centre for Salt Fish or Jaadi.

Transport

Road
Located on the A2 highway (Colombo-Galle-Hambantota-Wellawaya) a part of the Colombo-Galle road.

Rail
The station, constructed in 1900, has one platform and all non-express trains running on the Coastal Line stop at the station.

Education
The Sri Piyaratana School at Dodanduwa is the first Buddhist School in the country, and was inaugurated by Sri Piyaratana Tissa Mahanayake Thero in 1869.

Religion
 Island Hermitage
 Shailabimbarama Maha Viharaya
 Morakola Gangarama Temple
 Kumarakanda Maha Viharaya
 Rajarama Purana Viharaya

See also
List of towns in Southern Province, Sri Lanka

References

Populated places in Southern Province, Sri Lanka